The Junqueira cow is a cattle breed from Brazil that is the result of crosses between Caracu and other Brazilian varieties.  It is of the subspecies Bos taurus ibericus and has submetacentric Y chromosomes, suggesting it is taurine in origin. The breed has been raised since the 18th century, in São Paulo but only about 100 remained in 2005. However, it has been cloned in the laboratory by the Brazilian Agricultural Research Corporation.  Early on, its long horns were used  to  manufacture berrantes. Today, the Junqueira cow is an endangered species, with fewer than 100 left in Brazil.

References

Agriculture in Brazil
Cattle breeds